St: Paul's High School is an English/Malayalam-medium aided school for boys and girls run by Syro Malankara Catholic Diocese in a small village Veliyanad in Ernakulam district in Kerala. The school focuses on general all around development of its students, including moral, physical, social, scientific, and humanitarian education. Its academic programs are governed under the Kerala State Secondary Education Board.

The school has grades from 5 to 10th. The grades are divided as Upper Primary(UP) section and High School(HS) sections.

History

St: Paul's High School was founded on 14 January 1965. The school building was completed in 1968 and is still in use today. The objective of the school was to provide a moral as well as physical and intellectual education to students of all castes and creeds. Although the school is run by the Syro Malankara Catholic Diocese, it is open to children of all faiths. The school is affiliated with the Kerala State Secondary Education Board in Kerala.

Admissions

Students are admitted only at the beginning of the school year, which commences in mid March. In order to preserve academic standards, the following guidelines for admission are adhered to:

 For admission to any class they must complete a personal interview.
 The right age for the class will be strictly adhered to.
 No admission is complete until the Transfer Certificate from the previous school is produced. 
 The Principal reserves the right to refuse any application without reason.
 A month's notice or a month's fee is required prior to the withdrawal of a student.
 A written application must be made by the Parent or Guardian for the Transfer Certificate of a student.

Student life

Athletics
The school has two big playgrounds to support the sports and athletic needs of the students. Students are divided into four groups viz. Gandhi, Nehru, Patel and Bose and later contested against each other during Annual Sports week. The winning team will be awarded with an ever-rolling trophy. Track sports include 100 m, 200 m, 400 m, 800 m, 4X100 m Relay and 100 m hurdles and the field events are discus throw, javelin throw, and shot put. Most of the students take part in track and field and it is one of the most popular sports at the school.

The school has its own Foot Ball, Basket Ball and Volley  Balls courts in its campus. Various teams have represented the city and the state at the District and National Level Tournaments and Events.

Youth Festival

Every year the school organises a Youth Festival where students from the various groups contest against each other in various arts forms. It includes almost all the various classic forms of dances, singing and other arts forms like mimicry and mono-act. Other competitions include Dramma, Ballet etc. The winning team is given away with the ever-rolling Arts Trophy. Individual winners are later sent for various district and state level competitions.

School uniform

St: Pauls high School, like all other Indian schools, requires students to wear school uniforms at all times. The uniforms colours featured are white and maroon.

External links
 Syro Malankara Catholic Diocese
 Orkut Forum

References

Christian schools in Kerala
High schools and secondary schools in Kerala
Schools in Ernakulam district
Syro-Malankara Catholic Church